"Reach for the Sky" is the fifth single released by the American rock band FireHouse. As the first single from their second album, Hold Your Fire, the track reached No. 83 on the Billboard Hot 100 and No. 27 on the Album Rock Tracks chart. The song was written by guitarist Bill Leverty and vocalist C.J. Snare.

References

External links
Music Video for "Reach for the Sky"

1992 singles
FireHouse (band) songs
1992 songs
Epic Records singles
Songs written by Bill Leverty
Songs written by C. J. Snare